The Fort Lauderdale Fire and Safety Museum, located at 1022 West Las Olas Blvd., Fort Lauderdale, Florida, is housed in the Historic Fort Lauderdale Fire Station, built in 1927. It was no longer needed by the Fire Department after 2004, and was renovated as a museum. On display are photos, videos, historic uniforms, and equipment. It presents information on major fires and emergencies that challenged Fort Lauderdale firefighters through the years.

External links
 Official web page

Firefighting museums in the United States
Defunct fire stations in Florida
Museums in Fort Lauderdale, Florida
1927 establishments in Florida
Museums established in 1927
Firefighting in Florida